= Ratna Bahadur Bagchand =

Nepali judge and legal scholar

Justice, Supreme Court of Nepal
- Incumbent
- Assumed office November 2026

Personal details
- Born: Nepal
- Education: Clark University (MA), Danish Centre for Human Rights (Diploma), Tribhuvan University (Bachelor of Law), PhD in Judgment Execution System
- Occupation: Judge, Legal Scholar
- Profession: Judiciary
- Awards: Suprabal Janasewashree (2010), Dr. Ambedkar Excellency Award (2005), Outstanding Human Rights Lawyer Award (2003)
- Website: Supreme Court – Pokhara High Court

Ratna Bahadur Bagchand is a Nepali judge and legal scholar, currently serving as a Judge in the Supreme Court of Nepal. He has held various judicial positions across Nepal, including Judge-in-Charge at multiple High Court benches and member of the Special Court (Anti-Corruption Court of Nepal).

== Early life and education ==
Bagchand earned his PhD in Judgment Execution System in 2021. He holds an MA in International Development & Social Change from Clark University, USA (2009), a Diploma in Domestication of International Human Rights Laws from the Danish Centre for Human Rights (2001), and a Bachelor of Law (1993).

== Judicial career ==
He began his legal career as an advocate in District and Appellate Courts of then Seti Mahakali Zones (1993–2000) and served as a Public Interest Litigation lawyer at the Supreme Court of Nepal (2000–2009). Bagchand was appointed as a judge in several appellate and high courts, including Nepalgunj, Surkhet, Patan, Tulsipur, Baglung, Jumla, Biratnagar, Dhankuta, Birgunj and Pokhara. He has also taught cyber law as an adjunct faculty member at National Law College, Tribhuvan University.

== Contribution in Developing Jurisprudence ==
In the case of land cultivated by the father as Mohi, following the father’s demise, the Supreme Court has held that the right of Mohi ownership is not limited solely to the son recognized by the landowner, but extends to all brothers of the family. By interpreting the Land Related Act, 2021 in a just and equitable manner, this decision has been upheld as a precedent, marking a distinguished contribution by the judge in developing new jurisprudence.

== International engagement ==
Bagchand has participated in international judicial forums and lectures, including the Southeast Asia Regional Judicial Dialogue (Thailand, 2018), Thun Experts Forum on Federalism (Switzerland, 2007), and sessions at Harvard University and NYU School of Law (USA, 2008). He also attended the 66th Session of the UN Committee on the Elimination of Racial Discrimination (CERD) in Geneva, 2004.

== Research and publications ==
He has authored books and articles on cybercrime (ISBN 978-9937-161-04-6), caste discrimination, and judicial reform, including Cybercrime: Investigation, Prosecution and Adjudication (2023) and District, Appellate and Supreme Court's Judgments on Caste Discrimination Related Cases (2009). He has contributed to national newspapers and law journals on social justice, human rights, and legal reform.

== Awards ==
Bagchand has received several awards, including the Suprabal Jana Sewashree by the President of Nepal (2010), the Dr. Ambedkar Excellency Award from India (2005), and the Outstanding Human Rights Lawyer Award from the Development Board under the Government of Nepal (2003).

== Areas of interest ==
His areas of expertise include civil and criminal law, as well as anti-corruption, enforcement of court judgments, constitutional law, human rights, and commercial matters. He also has a strong interest in strengthening the capacities of judges, prosecutors, and advocates in the adjudication of cybercrime cases at both national and international levels.
